Saint Kitts and Nevis competed at the 2022 Commonwealth Games in Birmingham, England between July 28 and August 8, 2022. It was the team's ninth appearance at the Games.

The Saint Kitts and Nevis team consisted of six athletes (five men and one woman) competing in two sports.

St. Clair Hodge and Amya Clarke were the country's flagbearers during the opening ceremony.

Competitors
The following is the list of number of competitors participating at the Games per sport/discipline.

Athletics

Saint Kitts and Nevis entered four athletes in athletics, three men and one woman.

Track and road events

Field events

Beach volleyball

As of April 26, 2022, Saint Kitts and Nevis qualified for the men's tournament. The intended Americas/Caribbean qualifier was abandoned, so the quota allocation was determined by their position among other nations from those regions in the men's FIVB Beach Volleyball World Rankings (for performances between April 16, 2018 and March 31, 2022).

Men's tournament
Group A

References

External links
SKNOC Official site

Nations at the 2022 Commonwealth Games
Saint Kitts and Nevis at the Commonwealth Games
2022 in Saint Kitts and Nevis